The Morrua mine is a large mine located in the northern part of Mozambique in Zambezia Province. Morrua represents one of the largest tantalum reserves in Mozambique having estimated reserves of 7.5 million tonnes of ore grading 0.07% tantalum.

See also
Mineral industry of Mozambique

References 

Tantalum mines in Mozambique